Jim Hillyer may refer to:

 Jim Hillyer (American football) (1928–1991), American college football coach
 Jim Hillyer (politician) (1974–2016), Canadian politician